The New Beginning in Hiroshima was a professional wrestling pay-per-view (PPV) event promoted by New Japan Pro-Wrestling (NJPW). The event took place on February 9, 2014, in Hiroshima, Hiroshima at the Hiroshima Sun Plaza Hall. The event featured ten matches, three of which were contested for championships. It was the fifth event under the New Beginning name.

Storylines
The New Beginning in Hiroshima featured ten professional wrestling matches that involved different wrestlers from pre-existing scripted feuds and storylines. Wrestlers portrayed villains, heroes, or less distinguishable characters in the scripted events that built tension and culminated in a wrestling match or series of matches.

Event
Several matches during the event built to matches taking place at The New Beginning in Osaka two days later. The event also featured the NJPW debuts of National Wrestling Alliance (NWA) representatives Michael Tarver and Big Daddy Yum-Yum, who unsuccessfully challenged Satoshi Kojima for the NWA World Heavyweight Championship in the first title match of the event. The two other title matches were rematches from January 4's Wrestle Kingdom 8 in Tokyo Dome event; in the first Doc Gallows and Karl Anderson made their first successful defense of the IWGP Tag Team Championship against K.E.S. (Davey Boy Smith Jr. and Lance Archer) and in the main event Hiroshi Tanahashi made his first successful defense of the IWGP Intercontinental Championship against Shinsuke Nakamura.

Results

References

External links
The official New Japan Pro-Wrestling website

2014.1
2014 in professional wrestling
February 2014 events in Japan
2014 in Japan